Blind Date is a 2007 drama film directed by Stanley Tucci, who also stars and co-wrote the screenplay with David Schechter. The film premiered at the 2008 Sundance Film Festival. The film is a remake of the 1996 film of the same name by the late Dutch director Theo van Gogh.

Premise
While struggling to reconnect after the death of their daughter, a married couple construct an elaborate game of pretend on a series of blind dates, hoping that they will be able to openly talk about the state of their relationship in the wake of tragedy.

Cast
Stanley Tucci as Don, the husband
Patricia Clarkson as Janna, the wife
Thijs Römer as the waiter
Gerdy De Decker as the tango dancer
Georgina Verbaan as the cute woman
Robin Holzauer as the little girl
Sarah Hyland as the child
Peer Mascini as the sole drinker

References

External links

2007 films
2007 drama films
American independent films
American drama films
Films directed by Stanley Tucci
Films shot in Ghent
Films shot in London
Variance Films films
2007 independent films
2000s English-language films
2000s American films